George Edward Holderness (5 March 1913 – 21 October 1987) was an Anglican bishop.

He was born in 1913 and educated at Leeds Grammar School and  Keble College, Oxford. Ordained in 1936, he began his career with a curacy at Bedale and was then Chaplain at Aysgarth School until 1947, a period interrupted by World War II service as a Chaplain to the Forces. He was then Vicar of St Cuthbert's Church, Darlington and for 15 years suffragan Bishop of Burnley
in the Diocese of Blackburn. In 1970 he left Burnley to become Dean of Lichfield, a post he held to retirement in 1979. He died in 1987.

References 

1913 births
Clergy from Leeds
People educated at Leeds Grammar School
Alumni of Keble College, Oxford
20th-century Church of England bishops
Bishops of Burnley
Deans of Lichfield
1987 deaths